Lord Melville was launched in Leith in 1804. She served as a government transport, and was probably present at the Battle of Copenhagen (1807) as an armed transport. She was last listed in 1809.

Career
Lord Melville first appeared in Lloyd's Register (LR) in 1804.

Lord Melville may have been the transport of that name that in 1807 participated in the battle of Copenhagen. She was one of several transports that the commander-in-chief had ordered to be armed and that were carrying pennants, hence qualifying for prize money.

Fate
Lord Melville was last listed in the registers in 1809.

Notes and citations
Notes

Citations

1804 ships
Ships built in Leith
Age of Sail merchant ships of England